Temel Çakıroğlu (born 17 April 1959) is a Turkish judoka. He competed in the men's half-middleweight event at the 1988 Summer Olympics.

References

1959 births
Living people
Turkish male judoka
Olympic judoka of Turkey
Judoka at the 1988 Summer Olympics
Place of birth missing (living people)
20th-century Turkish people